Patricia Morrow is a former actress, best known for her portrayal of waif-like Rita Jacks in the primetime soap opera Peyton Place from 1965 to 1969.

Career

Acting career
Morrow usually appeared on television and made her debut in 1953, when she got the role of Constance Philbrick in I Led 3 Lives. She also played bit parts in several films, including Ma and Pa Kettle at Home (1954), Artists and Models (1955), The Bad Seed (1956), and The Wrong Man (1956).

Morrow later got supporting roles in films and started guest starring in several series in the 1960s, including Leave It to Beaver, My Three Sons and Perry Mason. In 1964, she got her first and only lead role in a film, a musical called Surf Party. She got more recognition when she landed the role of Rita Jacks in the soap opera Peyton Place. Despite only being contracted for a few episodes, she played the role for four years, between 1965 and 1969. During the show's run, Morrow became highly popular among the crowd.

Morrow reprised the role from 1972 to 1974 in Return to Peyton Place. She initially declined the role, saying she could not combine working five days a week on the show with law school. However, she accepted a contract of two working days a week and she motivated her return by saying: "I really can't turn down money. I have to use what earning power I have right now.

Morrow made her final screen appearance in 1985, playing yet again Rita Jacks in the made for television film Peyton Place: The Next Generation.

Post-acting career
Following the demise of Peyton Place, Morrow, inspired by visits to Vietnam, immersed in volunteer work with kids on probation in a ghetto in Los Angeles. On her motivation, she commented: "Those kids need a model. Somebody to say, 'You can do what you want, be what you want.' Most of them don't think they can do anything. It is only through agencies like the Legal Aid Society, that youngsters learn of outlets — where to go and how to get there."

During her volunteer work, Morrow became interested in political and legal leverage. She enrolled in  Glendale University College of Law, from which she graduated during her run on Return to Peyton Place. On her political contribution, Morrow commented: "I want to see if the democratic process works. I want to see if it can be done. I think a lot of our difficulties are perpetuated by untrained office holders, and I resent the fact most politicians don't know a darned thing about local problems."

Personal life
During the run of Peyton Place, Morrow had a relationship with her onscreen husband Christopher Connelly. Morrow married Carl Lance Brisson, the son of Rosalind Russell, in 1975. Shortly after their divorce in 1982, Morrow adopted a baby girl she named Marielle Margaret Morrow.  Her father was Robert (Bob) Morrow, a Los Angeles attorney and Patricia was raised in the Toluca Lake area.

Filmography

References

External links

Living people
American film actresses
American television actresses
Glendale University College of Law alumni
Actresses from Los Angeles
21st-century American women
Year of birth missing (living people)